Mimir and Balder Consult the Norns is an 1822 relief by Hermann Ernst Freund now on display in the Ny Carlsberg Glyptotek in Copenhagen, Denmark. The winning entry in a competition launched to promote the interest in Norse mythology among Danish artists, it depicts Mimir and Balder consulting the Norns. Works of Norse mythology would later dominate the rest of Freund's oeuvre, culminating with his monumental Ragnarok Frieze for Christian Frederik Hansen's new Christiansborg Palace.

Background

In 1801, Adam Oehlenschläger argued that Danish art should use Nordic themes instead of relying on Greek mythology for inspiration, as they would stimulate people's love for their homeland. The new trend was met with criticism from others, who observed that medieval sources did not provide any type of reference or information relevant to their images. This so-called Mythology Dispute dominated the Danish art scene in the years between 1812 and 1821, dividing the Royal Danish Academy of Fine Arts. In 1814, upon orders from Crown Prince Christian, it was made mandatory for the Academy's professor of history to include Nordic history and mythology in his teachings. It was also proposed to reproduce Johannes Wiedewelt's illustrations from the 1780s of Johannes Ewald's The Death of Balder (1669, published 1775). In 1819 and 1828, Finnur Magnússon was engaged as an instructor in mythology and Nordic literature for art students.

, secretary of the Academy of Fine Arts, refuted Jens Møller's ideas, stating that the Nordic themes were deformed and useless, unlike those of classical mythology, which was sublime, ideal and cultured. The painter  supported him, asserting that classical and Christian motifs should prevail in Danish art.

182122 Copenhagen Mythological Competition
In 1820, Jonas Collin, supported by Johan Bülow, fostered the idea of an artistic competition with a Nordic theme. On 21 May 1821, it was announced via advertisements in several Copenhagen newspapers. The competition  was also promoted by the Scandinavian Literature Society. It comprised three categories: sketches for paintings, relief compositions and drawings of individual figures. The deadline for participation in the competition was 1 May 1822 and the first prize in each category was 200 species daler. The jury consisted of Jonas Collin, historian Peter Erasmus Müller, writer Adam Oehlenschläger, architects Christian Frederik Hansen and Gustav Friedrich Hetsch, and painters Christian August Lorentzen and C. W. Eckersberg.

Hermann Ernst Freund won the first prize in the relief composition category for his relief of Mimir and Balder. Freund knew Collin from the Royal Mint. in a letter from October 1820, Collin had already prior to the competition suggested Freund create some works with inspiration from Norse mythology. In connection with the competition, he had also sent him Finnur Magnússon's translation of the Elder Edda and Oehlenschläger's .

Description
Freund's relief depicts Mimir and Balder consulting the Norns. The composition is very similar to that of Lund's winning entry in the painting category. The two artists were friends but it is not known who was inspired by whom.

See also
 The Death of Balder (Eckersberg)

References

Rxternal links
 Mimer og Balder rådspørger nornerne at Kunstindeks Danmark
Source

1822 sculptures
Sculptures of the Ny Carlsberg Glyptotek
Sculptures of Norse mythology in Copenhagen
Reliefs in Copenhagen
Plaster sculptures in Denmark